Sangia Nibandera Airport is an airport located at Kolaka, Southeast Sulawesi in Indonesia. The airport was opened on  June 25, 2010. The airport is named after Raja Sangia Nibandera, who was the first king of the Mekongga tribe (indigenous people of Kolka) and spread Islam in Kolaka region.

Airlines and destinations

Accidents
Because of being struck by lightning, fire destroyed the main terminal building of the airport on 26 November 2013.

References

External links
 Sangia Nibandera Airport - Indonesia Airport Global Website
  Situs web resmi Direktorat Jenderal Penerbangan Sipil, Sistem Database Keselamatan Penerbangan Nasional:Bandara Sangia Nibandera Kolaka Dikembangkan

Airports in Southeast Sulawesi